Endromis is a monotypic moth genus in the family Endromidae erected by Ferdinand Ochsenheimer in 1810. Its only species, Endromis versicolora, the Kentish glory, was described by Carl Linnaeus in his 1758 10th edition of Systema Naturae. It is found in the Palaearctic region.

The wingspan is 50–70 mm. The adults fly from March to May. Females are much larger and paler than males and fly only at night in order to lay eggs. Males, which fly both by night and day, can detect female pheromones from a distance up to 2 km.

Yellow at first, then purplish-brown eggs are laid in two or three rows around a thin birch branch. After 10 to 14 days little black caterpillars hatch.

The caterpillars primarily feed on birch (Betula species), but accept other trees and shrubs: Alnus, Corylus, Tilia and Carpinus species. It is green with paler stripes. At first it feeds in small groups of 15 to 30 larvae, but mature caterpillars feed individually and only at night.

Endromis versicolora has a single generation per year; it overwinters as a pupa in a thin loose strong cocoon buried shallowly in the soil.

External links

"67.001 BF1644 Kentish Glory Endromis versicolora (Linnaeus, 1758)". UKMoths.
Fauna Europaea
"06784 Endromis versicolora (Linnaeus, 1758) - Birkenspinner". Lepiforum e.V.

Endromidae
Moths of Asia
Moths of Europe
Macro-moths of Great Britain
Moths described in 1758
Taxa named by Carl Linnaeus
Monotypic moth genera